The Reivers is a 1962 book by William Faulkner.

The Reivers can also refer to:

The Reivers (band), an American band
The Reivers (film), a 1969 film based on the Faulkner novel
Border Reivers, raiders along the Anglo-Scottish border between the 13th and 16th centuries
The Reivers, a Scottish cricket franchise in the North Sea Pro Series
The Reivers, the nickname for sports teams at Iowa Western Community College

See also
Reaver (disambiguation)